St. James United Methodist Church is a historic Methodist church building at 916 Adams Street in Monroe, Louisiana.

It was built in 1923 in a Gothic Revival style and was added to the National Register of Historic Places in 1992.

References

United Methodist churches in Louisiana
Churches on the National Register of Historic Places in Louisiana
Gothic Revival church buildings in Louisiana
Churches completed in 1923
Churches in Ouachita Parish, Louisiana
Buildings and structures in Monroe, Louisiana
National Register of Historic Places in Ouachita Parish, Louisiana